Sir Brian Edward Frederick Fender,  (born 15 September 1934) is an English academic executive.

Career
Fender was Chief Executive of the Higher Education Funding Council for England from 1995 to 2001. Prior to that he was Vice-Chancellor of Keele University (1985–95), Associate Director and Director of the Institut Laue-Langevin in Grenoble, France and Chairman of the Science Board of the UK's Science and Engineering Research Council. He is a graduate and Fellow of Imperial College.

Sir Brian is currently a member of the University Grants Committee, Hong Kong, President of the National Foundation for Educational Research, Chairman of the National Council for Drama Training and a Director of Higher Aims Ltd, a private consultancy involved in higher education and research management. Sir Brian is a Fellow of the Institute of Physics, the Royal Society of Chemistry and a Companion of the Chartered Management Institute. He has honorary degrees or fellowships from eleven universities and colleges.

Sir Brian is the current chairman and President of the Institute of Knowledge Transfer.

Early life
Fender was born in Barrow-in-Furness, and lived in the Eden Valley until 1949. He attended Carlisle Grammar School and Sale County Grammar School.

Personal life
Fender has been married twice, and has a son and three daughters.

References

 

Academics of Imperial College London
Vice-Chancellors of Keele University
Fellows of the Institute of Physics
Alumni of Imperial College London
People educated at Carlisle Grammar School
People educated at Sale Grammar School
People from Barrow-in-Furness
Living people
1934 births
Knights Bachelor
Companions of the Order of St Michael and St George